The Netherlands women's national rugby sevens team participated in the IRB Women's Sevens Challenge Cup in Hong Kong losing to Spain in the Plate semi-finals, they finished 8th overall. In October 2012, the Netherlands was announced by the International Rugby Board as one of six  "core teams" that will compete in all four rounds of the inaugural IRB Women's Sevens World Series in 2012–13. The team finished seventh in the standings. It was later decided that the quarter-finalists at the 2013 Rugby World Cup Sevens would make up the eight core teams for the next series later that year.

History 
In the 2013–14 IRB Women's Sevens World Series they competed in only three tournaments, with a best results of 8th at São Paulo. The 2014–15 World Rugby Women's Sevens Series would double as an Olympics qualifier for Rio 2016. The Netherlands were not invited to any tournament, apart from the 2015 Netherlands Women's Sevens where they finished 11th. They missed their chances of any Olympic qualification after losing at the 2015 Rugby Europe Women's Sevens and the 2015 Rugby Europe Women's Sevens Olympic Repechage Tournament.

Netherlands won the 2018 Rugby Europe Women's Sevens Trophy and were promoted to the Grand Prix Series for 2019.

Tournament History

Rugby World Cup Sevens

2012 Hong Kong Sevens
Pool C

 28-21 
 19-5 
Finals

Plate semi finals
 0-14 

7th/8th
 5-0

Squad

Previous squads

Linda Frannssen (c)
Mara Moberg
Dorien Eppink
Inge Visser
Joyce van Altena
Anne Hielckert
Lorraine Laros
Annemarije van Rossum
Pien Selbeck
Kelly van Harskamp
Yale Belder
Alexia Mavroudis

References

Netherlands national rugby union team
Women's national rugby sevens teams